Human sexuality is the capacity to have erotic experiences and responses.

Sexuality may also refer to:
Sexuality (biology)
Animal sexuality
Plant sexuality
Sexuality of fungi
Sexuality (orientation)
Sexualities (journal), an academic journal
Sexuality (album), a 2008 album by Sébastien Tellier
"Sexuality" (Billy Bragg song) (1991)
"Sexuality" (Prince song) (1981)
"Sexuality", a 1995 song by k.d. lang from All You Can Eat

See also
Index of human sexuality articles
Plant reproduction
Sex (disambiguation)
Sexual attractiveness
Sexual identity

bg:Сексуалност
bar:Sexualität
bs:Seksualnost
ca:Sexualitat
cs:Sexualita
da:Seksualitet
de:Sexualität
et:Seksuaalsus
es:Sexualidad
eo:Sekseco
gl:Sexualidade
ko:인간의 성
hr:Seksualnost
is:Kynlíf
it:Sessualità
he:מיניות
ht:Seksyalite
lb:Sexualitéit
hu:Szexualitás
mk:Сексуалност
nl:Seksualiteit
no:Seksualitet
nn:Seksualitet
pl:Seksualność
ksh:Sekksowallitäd
fi:Seksuaalisuus
sv:Sexualitet
vi:Tình dục
zea:Seksualiteit